There were 146 medalists in the art competitions that were part of the Olympic Games from 1912 until 1948. These art competitions were considered an integral part of the movement by International Olympic Committee (IOC) founder Pierre de Coubertin and necessary to recapture the complete essence of the Ancient Olympic Games. Their absence before the 1912 Summer Olympics, according to journalism professor Richard Stanton, stems from Coubertin "not wanting to fragment the focus of his new and fragile movement". Art competitions were originally planned for inclusion in the 1908 Summer Olympics but were delayed after that edition's change in venue from Rome to London following the 1906 eruption of Mount Vesuvius. By the 1924 Summer Olympics they had grown to be considered internationally relevant and potentially "a milestone in advancing public awareness of art as a whole".

During their first three appearances, the art competitions were grouped into five broad categories: architecture, literature, music, painting, and sculpture. The Dutch Organizing Committee for the 1928 Summer Olympics split these into subcategories in the hopes of increasing participation. Although it was a successful strategy, the 1932 Summer Olympics eliminated several of these subcategories, which led to fewer entries in the broader categories. For the 1936 Summer Olympics, the German government proposed the addition of a film contest to the program, which was rejected.

Following a final appearance at the 1948 Summer Olympics, art competitions were removed from the Olympic program. Planners of the 1952 Summer Olympics opposed their inclusion on logistical grounds, claiming that the lack of an international association for the event meant that the entire onus of facilitation was placed on the local organizing committee. Concerns were also raised about the professionalism of the event, since only amateurs were allowed to participate in the sporting tournaments, and the growing commercialization of the competitions, as artists had been permitted to sell their submissions during the course of the Games since 1928. In 1952 an art festival and exhibition was held concurrent with the Games, a tradition that has been maintained in all subsequent Summer Olympics.

The IOC does not track medalists in Olympic art competitions in its database and thus the prize winners are only officially recorded in the original Olympic reports. Judges were not required to distribute first, second, and third place awards for every category, and thus certain events lack medalists in these placements. Since participants were allowed multiple submissions, it was also possible for artists to win more than one in a single event, as Alex Diggelmann of Switzerland did in the graphic arts category of the 1948 edition. Diggelmann is tied with Denmark's Josef Petersen, who won second prize three times in literature, for the number of medals captured in the art competitions. Luxembourg's Jean Jacoby is the only individual to win two gold medals, doing so in painting in 1924 and 1928. Of the 146 medalists, 11 were women and only Finnish author Aale Tynni was awarded gold. Germany was the most successful nation, with eight gold, seven silver, and nine bronze medals, although one was won by Coubertin himself, a Frenchman. He submitted his poem Ode to Sport under the pseudonyms Georges Hohrod and Martin Eschbach, as if it were a joint-entry, and won first prize in the 1912 literature category. The original report credits this medal to Germany. Two individuals, Walter W. Winans and Alfréd Hajós, won medals in both athletic and art competitions.

Architecture

Mixed architecture

Mixed architecture, architectural designs

Town planning

Literature

Mixed literature

Dramatic works

Epic works

Lyric and speculative works

Music

Mixed music

Compositions for orchestra

Solo and chorus compositions

Instrumental and chamber

Vocal

Painting

Mixed painting

Drawings and water colors

Engravings and etchings

Graphic works

Paintings

Sculpturing

Mixed sculpturing

Medals

Medals and plaques

Reliefs and medallions

Reliefs

Statues

Statistics

Multiple medalists

Medals per year

References

General

Specific

Notes

Art competitions
Arts awards
Architecture awards
Medalists in art competitions